This is a comprehensive discography of Emperor, a Notodden, Norway-based black metal band. Emperor has released four studio albums, two live albums, six EPs, two DVDs and three compilation albums.

Studio albums

Live albums

Compilation albums

EPs

Other

Split albums

Music videos

References
General

Specific

Heavy metal group discographies
Discographies of Norwegian artists